Komlós' theorem is a theorem from probability theory and mathematical analysis about the Cesàro convergence of a subsequence of random variables (or functions) and their subsequences to an integrable random variable (or function). It's also an existence theorem for an integrable random variable (or function). There exist a probabilistic and an analytical version for finite measure spaces.

The theorem was proven in 1967 by János Komlós. There exists also a generalization from 1970 for general measure spaces by Srishti D. Chatterji.

Komlós' theorem

Probabilistic version 
Let  be a probability space and  be a sequence of real-valued random variables defined on this space with 

Then there exists a random variable  and a subsequence , such that for every arbitrary subsequence  when  then

-almost surely.

Analytic version 
Then there exists a function  and a subsequence  such that for every arbitrary subsequence
 if  then

-almost everywhere.

Explanations 
So the theorem says, that the sequence  and all its subsequences converge in Césaro.

Literature 
Kabanov, Yuri & Pergamenshchikov, Sergei. (2003). Two-scale stochastic systems. Asymptotic analysis and control. 10.1007/978-3-662-13242-5. Page 250.

References 

Probability theorems
Theorems in analysis